Klemen Ferlin (born 26 June 1989) is a Slovenian handball player who plays for HC Erlangen and the Slovenian national team.

He represented Slovenia at the 2020 European Men's Handball Championship.

References

External links

1989 births
Living people
Handball players from Ljubljana
Slovenian male handball players
Expatriate handball players
Slovenian expatriate sportspeople in Germany
Handball-Bundesliga players
21st-century Slovenian people